Shikotan (Japanese: 色丹村, Shikotan-mura, Russian: Шикотан) is a village in Shikotan District, both of which are located in the disputed Northern Territories area of the Kuril Islands. It is currently administered by Russia as part of Yuzhno-Kurilsky District in Sakhalin Oblast, although Japan continues to claim it as part of Hokkaido Prefecture.

Etymology 
The name was originally called Shakotan and it comes from the Ainu language.

Geography 
The municipality and island is formed by the volcanic rock and sandstone of the Upper Cretaceous and Cenozoic periods. There are two extinct volcanoes on Shikotan: Mount Tomari and Mount Notoro.

References

Kuril Islands